Anastasius I Dicorus (– 9 July 518) was Eastern Roman emperor from 491 to 518. A career civil servant, he came to the throne at the age of 61 after being chosen by the wife of his predecessor, Zeno. His reign was characterised by reforms and improvements in the government, finances, economy, and bureaucracy of the Empire. He is noted for leaving the empire with a stable government, reinvigorated monetary economy and a sizeable budget surplus, which allowed the Empire to pursue more ambitious policies under his successors, most notably Justinian I.  Since many of Anastasius' reforms proved long-lasting, his influence over the Empire endured for many centuries.

Anastasius was a Miaphysite and his personal religious tendencies caused tensions throughout his reign in the Empire which was becoming increasingly divided along religious lines. He is venerated as a saint by the Syriac Orthodox Church on 29 July.

Early life and family

Anastasius was born at Dyrrachium; the date is unknown, but is thought to have been no later than 431. He was born into an Illyrian family. Anastasius had one black eye and one blue eye  (heterochromia), and for that reason he was nicknamed Dicorus ("two-pupiled"). Before becoming emperor, Anastasius was a particularly successful administrator in the department of finance.

Anastasius is known to have had a brother named Paulus, who served as consul in 496. With a woman known as Magna, Paulus was father to Irene, who married Olybrius. This Olybrius was the son of Anicia Juliana and Areobindus Dagalaifus Areobindus. The daughter of Olybrius and Irene was named Proba. She married Probus and was mother to a younger Juliana. This younger Juliana married another Anastasius, maternal grandson of Theodora, and was mother of Areobindus, Placidia, and a younger Proba, who married Flavius Anastasius, born in 530, and mothered  Areobindus, born in 550, and Placidia, born in 552 and wife of John Mystacon. Another nephew of Anastasius was Flavius Probus, consul in 502. Anastasius' sister, Caesaria, married Secundinus, and gave birth to Hypatius and Pompeius. Flavius Anastasius Paulus Probus Moschianus Probus Magnus, consul in 518, was a great-nephew of Anastasius. His daughter Juliana later married Marcellus, a brother of Justin II. The extensive family may well have included several viable candidates for the throne.

Accession 

Following the death of Zeno (491), there is strong evidence that many Roman citizens wanted an emperor who was an Orthodox Christian and a Roman proper. In the weeks following Zeno's death, crowds gathered in Constantinople chanting "Give the Empire an Orthodox Emperor!" Under such pressure, Ariadne, Zeno's widow, turned to Anastasius. Anastasius was in his sixties at the time of his ascension to the throne. It is noteworthy that Ariadne chose Anastasius over Zeno's brother Longinus, who was arguably the more logical choice; this upset the Isaurians. It was also not appreciated by the circus factions, the Blues and the Greens. These groups combined aspects of street gangs and political parties and had been patronised by Longinus. The Blues and Greens subsequently repeatedly rioted, causing serious loss of life and damage. Religiously, Anastasius' sympathies were with the Monophysites. Consequently, as a condition of his rule, the Patriarch of Constantinople required that he pledge not to repudiate the Council of Chalcedon.

Ariadne married Anastasius on 20 May 491, shortly after his accession on 11 April. He gained popular favour by a judicious remission of taxation, in particular by abolishing the hated tax on receipts which was mostly paid by the poor. He displayed great vigour and energy in administering the affairs of the Empire. His reforms improved the empire's tax base and pulled it from financial depression and bleak morale. By the end of his reign, it is claimed that the treasury had 320,000 lb gold reserve.

Foreign policy and wars 
Under Anastasius the Eastern Roman Empire engaged in the Isaurian War against the usurper Longinus and the Anastasian War against Sassanid Persia.

The Isaurian War (492–497) was stirred up by the Isaurian supporters of Longinus, the brother of Zeno, who was passed over for the throne in favour of Anastasius. The battle of Cotyaeum in 492 broke the back of the revolt, but guerrilla warfare continued in the Isaurian mountains for several years. The resistance in the mountains hinged upon the Isaurians' retention of Papirius Castle. The war lasted five years, but Anastasius passed legislation related to the economy in the mid-490s, suggesting that the Isaurian War did not absorb all of the energy and resources of the government. After five years, the Isaurian resistance was broken; large numbers of Isaurians were forcibly relocated to Thrace, to ensure that they would not revolt again.

During the Anastasian War of 502–505 with the Sassanid Persians, the Sassanids captured the cities of Theodosiopolis and Amida, although the Romans later received Amida in exchange for gold. The Persian provinces also suffered severely and a peace was concluded in 506. Anastasius afterward built the strong fortress of Daras, which was named Anastasiopolis, to hold the Persians at Nisibis in check. The Balkan provinces were denuded of troops, however, and were devastated by invasions of Slavs and Bulgars; to protect Constantinople and its vicinity against them, the emperor built the Anastasian Wall, extending from the Propontis to the Black Sea. He converted his home city, Dyrrachium, into one of the most fortified cities on the Adriatic with the construction of Durrës Castle.

Domestic and ecclesiastical policies 

The Emperor was a convinced Miaphysite. However, his ecclesiastical policy was moderate. He endeavoured to maintain the principle of the Henotikon of Zeno and the peace of the church. Yet, in 512, perhaps emboldened after his military success against the Persians, Anastasius I deposed the Patriarch of Chalcedon and replaced him with a Monophysite. This violated his agreement with the Patriarch of Constantinople and precipitated riots in Chalcedon. The following year the general Vitalian started a rebellion, quickly defeating an imperial army and marching on Constantinople. With the army closing in, Anastasius gave Vitalian the title of Commander of the Army of Thrace and began communicating with the Pope regarding a potential end to the Acacian schism. Two years later, General Marinus attacked Vitalian and forced him and his troops to the northern part of Thrace. Following the conclusion of this conflict, Anastasius had undisputed control of the Empire until his death in 518.

Successor 

The Anonymous Valesianus gives a (most likely fictional) account of Anastasius attempting to predict his successor: Anastasius did not know which of his three nephews would succeed him, so he put a message under one of three couches and had his nephews take seats in the room. He believed that the nephew who sat on the couch with the message would be his heir. However, two of his nephews sat on the same couch, and the one with the concealed message remained empty. After putting the matter to God in prayer, he determined that the first person to enter his room the next morning would be the next emperor, and that person turned out to be Justin, the chief of his guards.

Anastasius died childless in Constantinople on 9 July 518. He was 90 and a half years old according to the later chronicles of John Malalas ( 491–578) and the Chronicon Paschale ( 630). The early 6th-century historian Victor of Tunnuna states that he died at the age of 88, a figure accepted by most modern historians.

He became the last emperor known to be consecrated as divus on his death. The illiterate, peasant-born Justin then became the next emperor. Meanwhile, his nephew and future heir Justinian engrossed himself in the life of Constantinople.

Administrative reform and introduction of new coinage
Anastasius is famous for showing an uncommon interest in administrative efficiency and issues concerning the economy. Whenever it was possible in governmental transactions, he altered the method of payment from goods to hard currency. This practice decreased the potential for embezzlement and the need for transportation and storage of supplies. It also allowed for easier accounting. He also applied this practice to taxes, mandating that taxes be paid with cash rather than with goods. He eliminated the practice of providing soldiers with their arms and uniforms; instead he allotted each soldier a generous sum of money with which to purchase their own. These changes to imperial policy seem to have worked well; taxpayers often paid smaller tax bills than they had before, while government revenue increased. The increase in revenue allowed the emperor to pay soldiers a higher wage, which attracted native Roman soldiers to the military, as opposed to the barbarian and Isaurian mercenaries which some previous emperors had been forced to rely on. Anastasius is often cited for his "prudent management" of the empire's finances.

Amidst these reforms, though, Anastasius continued the practice of selling official positions. He sold so many that he has been accused of having facilitated the creation of a civilian aristocracy. This claim is strengthened by the growth in influence of families that often held high level positions in the government, such as the Apiones from Egypt. This has puzzled historians, given that the emperor seems to have minimised government corruption/inefficiency in other areas. Anastasius I also gave official positions to his close friend General Celer, his brother-in-law, his brother, his nephews, and his grand-nephews.

The complex monetary system of the early Byzantine Empire, which suffered a partial collapse in the mid-5th century, was revived by Anastasius in 498. The new system involved three denominations of gold, the solidus and its half and third; and five of copper, the follis, worth 40 nummi, and its fractions down to a nummus. It would seem that the new currency quickly became an important part of trade with other regions. A follis coin has been found in the Charjou desert, north of the River Oxus. Four solidi from his reign have been recovered as far from the Roman Empire as China. China might seem an unlikely trading partner, but the Romans and the Chinese were probably able to do business via Central Asian merchants travelling along the Silk Roads. Some Roman trading partners attempted to replicate the coins of Anastasius. The currency created by Anastasius stayed in use and circulated widely for long after his reign.

A 40-nummi coin of Anastasius is depicted on the obverse of North Macedonia's 50 denar banknote, issued in 1996.

See also

 List of Byzantine emperors

References

Sources 
 
 
 

 
 
 
 
 
 
 
 
 
Zacharias of Mytilene, Syriac Chronicle, Book VII, Chapter VI

External links 
 
 

430s births
518 deaths
5th-century Byzantine emperors
6th-century Byzantine emperors
5th-century Roman consuls
6th-century Roman consuls
Anastasian War
Burials at the Church of the Holy Apostles
House of Leo
Illyrian people
Imperial Roman consuls
Oriental Orthodox monarchs
People from Durrës
People of the Roman–Sasanian Wars
Illyrian emperors